Young People is a 1972 Hong Kong coming-of-age action drama film directed by Chang Cheh and starring David Chiang, Ti Lung, Chen Kuan-tai, Irene Chan and pop singer Agnes Chan, the younger sister of Irene Chan, in her debut film role.

Plot
Martial arts club member Ho Tai's (Chen Kuan-tai) girlfriend Princess (Irene Chan) is the school babe, who also attracts the pursuit by star athlete Lam Tat (Ti Lung). Lam always ridicules Ho and they develop a bad relation. On the other hand, music club leader Hung Wai (David Chiang), who came from a family of martial arts, teaches martial arts to his club members to raise their spirits. Because of Princess, Lam got into a fight with Ho during jogging practice and Hung came to break up the fight. The two finally buried their hatchet. During the school's cart racing competition, Lam and Ho, out of gratitude for Hung, helped him win the championship.

Cast
David Chiang as Hung Wai
Ti Lung as Lam Tat
Chen Kuan-tai as Ho Tai
Irene Chan as Princess
Agnes Chan as Po Erh
Wu Ma as Gao
Chin Feng as Hung Wai's brother
Lo Dik as Basketball coach Wong
Wong Chung as Basketball player
Tang Tak-cheung as Basketball player
Danny Chow as Basketball player
Bolo Yeung as Basketball player
Wang Kuang-yu as Basketball player
Bruce Tong as Basketball player
Yeung Chak-lam as Basketball player
Wu Chi-chin as Basketball player
Lei Lung as Basketball player
Fan Mei-sheng as Basketball player
Ho Hon-chau
Wong Ching as Cheung Wai Shing
Sze-ma Wah-lung as TV reporter
Wong Pau-gei as Wong Pui
Lau Kar-wing as Johnny Lau
Lee Yung-git as Martial arts student
Tino Wong as Martial arts student
Law Keung as Martial arts student
Lau Jun-fai as Martial arts student
 as Martial arts student
Lau Gong as Martial arts student
Law Lok-lam as Music group member
Benz Hui as Music group member
Chui Fat as Music group member
Kwan Chung as Music group member
Law Wai-chiu as Music group member
Lee Chiu as Basketball referee
Lo Wai as Kung Fu referee
Wong Mei as Kung Fu referee
Huang Ha as Tournament fighter
Max Lee as Tournament fighter
Yeung Pak-chan as Tournament audience
Yen Shi-kwan as Ho Tai's ring assistant
Ko Hung as Ho Tai's ring assistant
Hsu Hsia as Wai Shing's ring assistant
Chin Chun as VIP at basketball match
Ting Tung as Cinematographer at cart race
Wai Kong-sing
Cheung Wing-kai
Lee Wai-hoi
Alexander Fu Sheng as Drum player
Fung Hak-on
Alan Chan
To Wai-leung
Chan Siu-gai
Paul Tarrant as kart racer
Arthur Tarrant as kart mechanic extra
Mark Tarrant as kart race audience extra

Box office
The film grossed HK$1,223,950 at the Hong Kong box office during its theatrical run from 7 to 19 July 1972 in Hong Kong.

External links

Young People at Hong Kong Cinemagic

1972 films
1970s musical drama films
Hong Kong drama films
Hong Kong martial arts films
1970s teen drama films
Kung fu films
Martial arts tournament films
Basketball films
Hong Kong auto racing films
Athletics films
Films directed by Chang Cheh
1970s Mandarin-language films
Films set in Hong Kong
Films shot in Hong Kong
Shaw Brothers Studio films
1972 martial arts films
1970s dance films
Hong Kong dance films
1972 drama films
1970s coming-of-age films
1970s Hong Kong films